Nanditha K. S. was a poet from Kerala who wrote poems in Malayalam and English. Her poems were discovered in her diary after her death and published as a collection.

Biography
She was born on May 21, 1969 in Madakkimala, Wayanad district to Shreedharan Menon and Prabhavathy Menon. After her schooling in Government Ganpath Model Girls High School, Chalappuram, she completed her higher education from Zamorin's Guruvayurappan College, Farook College,  University of Calicut English Department 
and Mother Teresa Women's University, Chennai. 
After completing her B.A. and M.A. degrees, she worked as guest lecturer for English at the Wayanad Muttil Muslim Orphanage Arts and Science College. She applied to pursue a Ph.D. on the topic of “Personal Freedom – A Dilemma: An iconoclastic approach to the ideals of womanhood with reference to the novels of Gail Godwin.”

Nanditha took her life on 17 January 1999. After her death, her parents discovered a diary of her poems which she had not shared with anyone. A collection of her poems written between 1985 through 1993 were published in a book form as Nandithayude Kavithakal, under the initiative of the Malayalam literary critic, M. M. Basheer. The first edition of the book was published in 2002 and eighth edition in 2018.

Death and love were common themes in her poems. Though most of her poems were in Malayalam she also wrote in English. 
Her life was the subject of the film titled Nanditha released in 2017.

References

External links
Documentary on Nanditha in Malayalam

1969 births
1999 suicides
20th-century Indian women writers
20th-century Indian writers
Women writers from Kerala
Poets from Kerala
Malayalam poets
People from Wayanad district
University of Calicut alumni
Suicides in India